Captain Richard Martin Woodman LVO (born 1944) is an English novelist and naval historian who retired in 1997 from a 37-year nautical career, mainly working for Trinity House, to write full-time.

Writing
His main work is 14 novels about the career of Nathaniel Drinkwater, and shorter series about James Dunbar and William Kite, but he also has written a range of factual books about 18th century and WW2 history. These include a trilogy of studies of convoys in the Second World War and a five volume history of the British Merchant Navy. Unlike many other modern naval historical novelists, such as C.S. Forester or Patrick O'Brian, he has served afloat.  He went to sea at the age of sixteen as an indentured midshipman and has spent eleven years in command.  His experience ranges from cargo-liners to ocean weather ships and specialist support vessels as well as yachts, square-riggers, and trawlers.

Woodman is a regular correspondent for the shipping newspaper Lloyd's List and continues his close association with the sea as a keen yachtsman. He also serves on the Corporate Board of Trinity House.  He has won several awards including the Society for Nautical Research's Anderson Medal in 2005 and the Marine Society's Harmer Award in 1978.

Honours
Woodman was appointed Lieutenant of the Royal Victorian Order (LVO) in the 2014 New Year Honours for his services to Trinity House.

Books

Nathaniel Drinkwater series
 An Eye of the Fleet
 A King's Cutter
 A Brig of War
 The Bomb Vessel
 The Corvette
 1805
 Baltic Mission
 In Distant Waters
 A Private Revenge
 Under False Colours
 The Flying Squadron
 Beneath the Aurora
 The Shadow of the Eagle
 Ebb Tide

William Kite trilogy
 The Guineaman
 The Privateersman
 The East Indiaman

James Dunbar novels
 Waterfront
 Under Sail

Kit Faulkner novels
 A Ship for the King
 For King or Commonwealth
 The King's Chameleon

Other fiction
 The Ice Mask
 Dead Man Talking
 Wager
 Endangered Species
 The Darkening Sea
 Voyage East or The Antigone
 The Accident
 Act of Terror
 Captain of the Caryatid
 The Cruise of the Commissioner
 "Decision at Trafalgar"

Non-Fiction
 The Sea Warriors
 The Victory of Seapower, 1806–1814
 Keepers of the Sea: The Yachts and Tenders of Trinity House
 The Lighthouses of Trinity House
 A Brief History of Mutiny
 View from the Sea
 Arctic Convoys, 1941–1945
 Malta Convoys
 The Real Cruel Sea, The Merchant Navy in the Battle of the Atlantic, 1939–1943
 The History of the Ship
 The Story of Sail (co-author)
 ...Of Daring Temper, The History of The Marine Society
 A History of the British Merchant Navy
 Neptune's Trident
 Britannia's Realm
 Masters Under God
 More Days, More Dollars
 Fiddler's Green

References

1944 births
Living people
English historical novelists
20th-century English novelists
21st-century English novelists
English naval historians
Nautical historical novelists
Lieutenants of the Royal Victorian Order
British Merchant Navy officers
English male novelists
20th-century English male writers
21st-century English male writers
English male non-fiction writers